The 1964 United States Senate elections were held on November 3. The 33 seats of Class 1 were contested in regular elections. Special elections were also held to fill vacancies. They coincided with the election of President Lyndon B. Johnson by an overwhelming majority, to a full term. His Democratic Party picked up a net two seats from the Republicans. , this was the last time either party has had a two-thirds majority in the Senate, which would have hypothetically allowed the Senate Democrats to override a veto, propose constitutional amendments, convict and expel certain officials, or invoke cloture without any votes from Senate Republicans. In practice, however, internal divisions effectively prevented the Democrats from doing so. The Senate election coincided with Democratic gains in the House in the same year.

In a close race in Nevada, Democratic incumbent Howard Cannon won re-election over Republican Lieutenant Governor Paul Laxalt by fewer than 100 votes. Laxalt joined Cannon in the Senate when he won Nevada's other seat in 1974. Patrick V. McNamara (D) later died April 30, 1966, and was replaced May 11, 1966, by appointee Robert P. Griffin (R), reducing Democrats' majority to 67-33.

Notably, of the 35 seats up for election this year, 26 were held by Democrats, who managed to retain 25 of them. A party defending two-thirds of the seats up for election would not make net gains in the Senate again until 2012. Coincidentally, it would be the same Senate class, class 1. This is the earliest round of Senate elections in which a first-elected member is still alive. (Fred Harris, D-OK)

Results summary 

Source:

Gains, losses, and holds

Retirements
One Republican and two Democrats retired instead of seeking re-election.

Defeats
One Republican and seven Democrats sought re-election but lost in the primary or general election.

Post-election changes
One Democrat died on April 30, 1966, and was replaced on May 11, 1966, by a Republican appointee.

Change in composition

Before the elections

Elections results

Race summary

Special elections during the 88th Congress 
In these special elections, the winner was seated during 1964 or before January 3, 1965; ordered by election date, then state.

Elections leading to the next Congress 
In these general elections, the winners were elected for the term beginning January 3, 1965; ordered by state.

All of the elections involved the Class 1 seats.

Closest races 
Fifteen races had a margin of victory under 10%:

Michigan is the tipping point state with a margin of 29.1%.

Arizona 

Incumbent Barry Goldwater decided not to run for re-election to a third term, instead running for President of the United States as the Republican Party nominee against Lyndon B. Johnson. Governor of Arizona Paul Fannin ran unopposed in the Republican primary, and defeated Democratic nominee Roy Elson, who was a staff member for U.S. senator Carl Hayden until Hayden's retirement in 1969. Despite a landslide loss throughout the country, and Goldwater only able to obtain 50.45% of the vote in his home state of Arizona, Fannin managed to prevail in the state's Senate election. Goldwater would win the election for the other Senate seat in 1968 when Hayden retired from the post and serving two more terms.

California 

Democratic incumbent Pierre Salinger, who had been appointed to the seat following the death of Senator Clair Engle three months earlier, was defeated in his bid for a full term by Republican candidate George Murphy, a retired actor.

Connecticut 

Democrat Thomas J. Dodd was re-elected and served a second term. John Davis Lodge, grandson of Henry Cabot Lodge was defeated by almost 30%.

Delaware 

Republican incumbent John J. Williams was reelected to a fourth term, defeating Democratic Governor Elbert N. Carvel.

Florida 

Democratic incumbent Spessard Holland was reelected to a fourth term in a landslide, defeating the Republican candidate, future governor Claude R. Kirk Jr.

Hawaii 

Republican incumbent Hiram Fong was reelected to a second term, defeating Democratic Congressman Thomas Gill

Indiana 

Democratic incumbent Vance Hartke was reelected to a second term, defeating Republican State Senator Russell Bontrager.

Maine 

Democratic incumbent Edmund Muskie was reelected to a second term, defeating Republican Congressman Clifford McIntire in a landslide.

Maryland 

Republican incumbent J. Glenn Beall was defeated in his bid for a third term by Democratic candidate Joseph Tydings, the former United States Attorney for the District of Maryland and son of former Senator Millard Tydings.

Beall's own son, J. Glenn Beall Jr., would go on to defeat Tydings six years later.

Massachusetts 

Incumbent Democrat Ted Kennedy, who had won a special election two years earlier, defeated his challengers to win his second (his first full) Senate term. Much of the campaign-appearance burden on behalf of Ted Kennedy fell on his wife, Joan, because of Ted's serious back injury in a plane crash.

Candidates:
 Ted Kennedy - Incumbent senator elected in 1962 to the unexpired term of John F. Kennedy.
 Howard J. Whitmore, Jr. - Member of Massachusetts House of Representatives from 1947 to 1953, and mayor of Newton, Massachusetts from 1954 to 1960. Served in the United States Army Air Forces in World War II.
 Lawrence Gilfedder - Candidate for Lt. Governor in 1948. Ran for Governor in 1952 and 1954. Ran for Senate in 1958, 1960, 1962, 1964, 1966, and 1970.
 Grace F. Luder - Candidate for Massachusetts's 9th congressional district seat in 1950 and Massachusetts's 14th congressional district seat in 1952.

Michigan 

Democratic incumbent Philip Hart was easily reelected to a second term over Republican challenger Elly M. Peterson.

Minnesota 

Incumbent Democrat Eugene McCarthy defeated Republican challenger Wheelock Whitney, Jr., to win a second term.

Mississippi 

Democratic incumbent John C. Stennis was reelected virtually unopposed to a fourth term, even as Republican candidate Barry Goldwater carried Mississippi in the presidential election. Stennis received 97% of the vote in the Democratic primary and faced no Republican challenger in the general election.

Missouri 

Democratic incumbent Stuart Symington was reelected to a third term in a landslide, defeating Republican candidate Jean Paul Bradshaw.

Montana 

Incumbent Democrat Mike Mansfield, who was first elected to the Senate in 1952 and was re-elected in 1958, ran for re-election. Mansfield won the Democratic primary in a landslide, and advanced to the general election, where he faced Alex Blewett, the Majority Leader of the Montana House of Representatives and the Republican nominee. Though Mansfield's margin was significantly reduced from 1958, he still overwhelmingly defeated Blewett and won his third term in the Senate.

Nebraska 

Republican incumbent Roman Hruska was reelected in a landslide over Democratic challenger Raymond Arndt.

Nevada 

Incumbent Democratic U.S. Senator Howard Cannon won re-election to a second term by a razor-thin margin of only 48 votes over Republican Lieutenant Governor Paul Laxalt.

New Jersey 

Democratic incumbent Harrison A. Williams was reelected to a second term over Republican candidate Bernard M. Shanley, a former white house staffer during the Eisenhower administration.

New Mexico

New Mexico (regular) 

Incumbent Republican Edwin L. Mechem, who had been appointed to the seat following the death of Democrat Dennis Chávez two years earlier, sought election to a full term, but was defeated by Democrat Joseph Montoya.

Montoya was Lieutenant Governor of New Mexico (1947–1951 and 1955–1957) and a four-term member of the U.S. House of Representatives (1957–1964).

New Mexico (special) 

Montoya was also elected to finish the term ending January 3, 1965.

New York 

Incumbent Republican U.S. Senator Kenneth Keating ran for re-election to a second term, but was defeated by Robert F. Kennedy, the former United States Attorney General and brother of former President John F. Kennedy and Massachusetts Senator Ted Kennedy.

The Socialist Labor state convention met on March 29, and nominated John Emanuel. The Republican state convention met on August 31, and re-nominated the incumbent U.S. Senator Kenneth B. Keating. The Conservative state convention met on August 31 at Saratoga Springs, New York, and nominated Prof. Henry Paolucci. The Democratic state convention met on September 1, and nominated U.S. Attorney General Robert F. Kennedy on the first ballot, with 968 votes against 153 for Congressman Samuel S. Stratton. The Liberal Party met on September 1, and endorsed the Democratic nominee, U.S. Attorney General Robert F. Kennedy. The Socialist Workers Party filed a petition to nominate candidates on September 7. Richard Garza was nominated.

John English, a Nassau County leader who helped John F. Kennedy during the 1960 presidential election, encouraged Robert Kennedy to oppose Keating. At the time, Samuel S. Stratton, a member of the United States House of Representatives from New York's 35th congressional district, was considered the most likely Democratic candidate. At first, Kennedy resisted. After President Kennedy's assassination, Robert Kennedy remained as Attorney General for Lyndon B. Johnson. However, Johnson and Kennedy feuded. Kennedy decided to run for the Senate in New York in August, and resigned from the Cabinet on September 3, 1964. While many reform Democrats resisted Kennedy, support from Robert F. Wagner, Jr., and party bosses like Charles A. Buckley, of The Bronx, and Peter J. Crotty, of Buffalo, helped Kennedy win the nomination at the party convention.

During the campaign, Kennedy was frequently met by large crowds. Keating accused Kennedy of being a carpetbagger from Massachusetts. Kennedy responded to these charges in a televised town meeting by saying, "If the senator of the state of New York is going be selected on who's lived here the longest, then I think people are going vote for my opponent. If it's going be selected on who's got the best New York accent, then I think I'm probably out too. But I think if it's going be selected on the basis of who can make the best United States senator, I think I'm still in the contest."

The Democratic/Liberal candidate was elected. Campaign help from President Lyndon B. Johnson, as well as the Democratic landslide after the assassination of John F. Kennedy, helped carry Kennedy into office, as Kennedy polled about 1.1 million votes less in New York than Johnson did. The incumbent Keating was defeated.

(For Total Votes, the Democratic and Liberal votes for Kennedy are combined.)

North Dakota 

Incumbent Democratic-NPL Senator Quentin Burdick sought and received re-election to his second term, defeating Republican candidate Thomas S. Kleppe, who later became the United States Secretary of the Interior.

Only Burdick filed as a Democratic-NPLer, and the endorsed Republican candidate was Thomas S. Kleppe, who would go on to serve two terms as a Representative for North Dakota's second congressional district from 1967 to 1971. Burdick and Kleppe won the primary elections for their respective parties.

Ohio 

Democratic incumbent Stephen M. Young narrowly won reelection to a second term over Republican Congressman Robert Taft Jr., the son of former Senator Robert A. Taft and grandson of former President William Howard Taft.

Taft would go on to win the seat in the next election, serving one term in the Senate.

Oklahoma (special) 

This election was to determine who would serve for the final two years of the term to which Robert S. Kerr had been elected in 1960. Kerr had died in January 1963, and outgoing Governor J. Howard Edmondson was appointed to take his place. Edmondson hoped to win the special election, but lost the Democratic primary to former state senator Fred R. Harris, who then won the general election over University of Oklahoma football coach Bud Wilkinson.

Pennsylvania 

Incumbent Republican U.S. Senator Hugh Scott successfully sought re-election to a second term, defeating Democratic nominee Genevieve Blatt.

Rhode Island 

Democratic incumbent John Pastore won reelection to a third full term (and fourth overall), defeating Republican candidate Ronald Lagueux by more than 65 percentage points.

Tennessee

Tennessee (regular) 

Incumbent Democrat Albert Gore Sr. was re-elected to a third term over Republican candidate Dan Kuykendall.

Tennessee (special) 

Democratic Congressman Ross Bass won the special election to serve the remaining 26 months of the term to which the late Estes Kefauver had been elected in 1960. He defeated Republican candidate Howard Baker, who would go on to win the seat in the regular election two years later.

Texas 

Incumbent Democrat Ralph Yarborough defeated future President of the United States George H. W. Bush.

Although Yarborough won this election, he would lose the Democratic Primary six years later, in 1970, to Lloyd Bentsen.  Bush later went on to win an election for the United States House of Representatives in 1966; he was elected vice president of the United States in 1980 and was elected president in 1988.

Utah 

Democratic incumbent Frank Moss was reelected to a second term over Republican candidate Ernest L. Wilkinson, the president of Brigham Young University.

Vermont 

Incumbent Republican Winston L. Prouty successfully ran for re-election, defeating Democratic candidate Frederick J. Fayette.

Virginia 

Incumbent Harry F. Byrd was re-elected to a seventh term, defeating Republican Richard A. May and independent James W. Respess.

Washington 

Democratic incumbent Henry M. Jackson was reelected to a third term in a landslide, defeating Republican challenger Lloyd J. Andrews, who had previously served as the state's Superintendent of Public Instruction.

West Virginia 

Democratic incumbent Robert Byrd was reelected to a second term over Republican candidate Cooper Benedict. Byrd would serve in the Senate until his death in 2010, making him the longest-serving senator in United States history.

Wisconsin 

Incumbent Democrat William Proxmire was reelected to a second full term, defeating Republican Wilbur Renk.

Wyoming

See also
 1964 United States elections
 1964 United States gubernatorial elections
 1964 United States presidential election
 1964 United States House of Representatives elections
 88th United States Congress
 89th United States Congress

References

External links
 
 Official result in New York City: Canvass Shows Conservatives Rivaled Liberals in City Vote in NYT on November 26, 1964 (subscription required)
 Images from the Robert Kennedy campaign